The following is a timeline of women's colleges in the United States. These are institutions of higher education in the United States whose student population comprises exclusively, or almost exclusively, women. They are often liberal arts colleges. There are approximately 35 active women's colleges in the U.S. as of 2021.

Colleges are listed by the date in which they opened their doors to students.

First and oldest

Many of the schools began as either schools for girls, academies (which during the late 18th and early 19th centuries was the equivalent of secondary schools), or as a teaching seminary (which during the early 19th century were forms of secular higher education), rather than as a chartered college. During the 19th century in the United States, "Seminaries educated women for the only socially acceptable occupation: teaching. Only unmarried women could be teachers. Many early women's colleges began as female seminaries and were responsible for producing an important corps of educators."

The following is a list of "oldest" and "first" schools:

1742: Bethlehem Female Seminary, (now Moravian College): established as a seminary for girls, it eventually became the Moravian Seminary and College for Women and later merged with nearby schools to become the coeducational school, Moravian College.
1772: Salem College, North Carolina: Formed as the Little Girls' School by the Moravian Single Sisters and then renamed as the Salem Female Academy, it is the oldest women's educational institution to be in continuous operation.
1803: Bradford Academy (later renamed Bradford College) – First Academy in Massachusetts to admit women.  The first graduating class had 37 women and 14 men.
1818: Elizabeth Female Academy: first female educational institution in Mississippi; it closed in 1843
1821: Clinton Female Seminary in Clinton, Georgia; later merged to become Georgia Female College (now Wesleyan College in Macon) chartered in 1836; the first college charted from its inception as a full college for women.
1827: The Linden Wood School for Girls (now Lindenwood University): is the first institution of higher education for women west of the Mississippi River.
1833: Columbia Female Academy (now Stephens College): Originally established as an academy (for both high school and college-aged women), it later became a four-year college. It is the second oldest female educational establishment that is still a women's college.
1836: Georgia Female College (now Wesleyan College), Macon, Georgia: It is the oldest (and the first) school which was established from inception as a full college for women offering the same education as men. Awarded the first known baccalaureate degree to a woman.
1837: St. Mary's Hall (now Doane Academy): Originally established as a female seminary by George Washington Doane 2nd Bishop of the Episcopal Church of New Jersey. First academic school founded on church principles in the United States. Now a PK-12 Co-educational day school.
1837: Mount Holyoke Female Seminary (now Mount Holyoke College): It is the oldest (and first) of the Seven Sisters. It is also the oldest school which was established from inception (chartered in 1836) as an institution of higher education for women (teaching seminary) that is still a women's college.
1838: Judson College for Women, Marion, Alabama.  It was also intended as an institute of higher learning from inception. When it announced its closure in 2021, it was the fifth oldest women's college.
1842: Valley Union Seminary (now Hollins University): It is the oldest chartered women's college in Virginia.
1844: Saint Mary's College (Indiana): Founded by the Sisters of the Holy Cross. The first women's college in the Great Lakes region (founded in southern Michigan, and moved to its present site in Notre Dame, Indiana in 1855).
1845: Baylor Female College, now the University of Mary Hardin-Baylor, Belton, Texas. Chartered by the Republic of Texas.
1845: Limestone College in Gaffney, South Carolina. Limestone was the third private college in South Carolina and the first women's college, which it remained until becoming fully coeducational in the 1960s.
1848: Philadelphia School of Design for Women (now Moore College of Art and Design): It is the first and only art school which is a women's college.
1850 "Women's Medical College of Pennsylvania" (now part of "Drexel University") trained and graduated the first female physicians in the country and the first black female physicians.
1851: Cherokee Female Seminary: It is the first institute of higher learning exclusively for women the United States west of the Mississippi River. Along with the Cherokee Male Seminary, this was the first college created by a tribe instead of the US federal government.
1851: Auburndale Female Seminary (now Lasell College): A private institution founded by Edward Lasell, becomes the first "successful and persistent" junior college in the United States, and the first junior college for women. It began offering four-year bachelor's degrees in 1989 and became coeducational in 1997.
1851: Tennessee and Alabama Female Institute (later Mary Sharp College): It was the first women's college to grant college degrees to women that were the equivalent of those given to men; the college closed due to financial hardship in 1896.
1851: "College of Notre Dame" (now Notre Dame de Namur University): This was the first women's college in California and the first in the state authorized to grant the baccalaureate degree to women. The university is now coed. It became a graduate school in 2021.
1852: Young Ladies Seminary (now Mills College at Northeastern University): It was the first women's college in United States west of the Rocky Mountains
1853: Beaver Female Seminary (now Arcadia University) settled in Jenkintown, PA after its establishment in Beaver, PA.  It admitted boys for a short time at the turn of the 20th century before ultimately returning to an all women's school. By 1907, its name had changed to Beaver College, moving to its current location (Glenside, PA) in 1962. In the Fall of 1972, the college became co-educational.  The college changed its name for the final time in July 2001 and became Arcadia University.
1853: Mt. Carroll Seminary (now Shimer College): A women's seminary started by Frances Shimer, became coeducational in 1950.
1854: Columbia Female College (now Columbia College): Located Columbia, South Carolina.  The college has survived the march of General Sherman and 3 campus fires.  Georgia O'Keeffe taught for a year before she created her own artistic way.  The college's day program is still all-female, but its evening program is coed.
1855: Davenport Female College (later Davenport College): Founded in Lenoir, North Carolina. Merged with Greensboro College in 1938.Davenport College history
1855: Elmira Female College (now Elmira College): It is the oldest college still in existence which (as a women's college) granted degrees to women that were the equivalent of those given to men; the college became coeducational in 1969.
1861: Vassar College: One of the Seven Sisters which was established from inception as a college for women; it became coeducational in 1969. Student Right to Know Information
1867: Cedar Crest College: Established in 1867 in the basement of a church, it now is one of the top modern female colleges. 
1867: Scotia Seminary (now Barber-Scotia College): It was the first historically black female institution of higher education established after the American Civil War and became a women's college in 1946. It became coeducational school in 1954 and lost its accreditation in 2004.
1868: Wells College: Located in Aurora, N.Y. Went coed in 2005.
1869: Wilson College: Located in Chambersburg, PA. Chartered in March 1869 and began instruction in October 1970. It became coeducational in 2014.
1869: Chatham University: Located in Pittsburgh, PA. Established as Pennsylvania Female College, renamed Pennsylvania College for Women in 1890 and to Chatham College in 1955. Chatham gained University status in 2007.
1870: Wellesley College chartered; opened in 1875. One of the Seven Sisters which was established from inception as a college for women and remains such to this day.
1871: Smith College chartered; opened in 1875. One of the Seven Sisters which was established from inception as a college for women and remains such to this day.
1871: Ursuline College was established from inception as a college for women in Cleveland, Ohio by the Sisters of Ursuline.  The Sisters of Ursuline had come to Cleveland from France and were granted a charter by the state of Ohio. Ursuline College is still a women's focused institution of higher education with less than 10% men in attendance. Known as the 2nd best college for Nursing in the state of Ohio and is nationally recognized for its BSN, MSN & PDN programs.  
1878: Georgia Baptist Female Seminary (now the Brenau University Women's College): Despite its name, the college was never formally associated with any church or religious group. Founded in Gainesville, Georgia, it became Brenau College in 1900 and Brenau University in 1992. The university still boasts its robust Women's College on its historic Gainesville campus today, educating women to be, as its motto states, "as gold refined by fire."

1881:  Atlanta Baptist Female Seminary (now Spelman College): It was the first historically black female institution of higher education to receive its collegiate charter in 1924, making it the oldest historically black women's college.
1884: Industrial Institute & College, (now Mississippi University for Women): It was the first public women's college; became coeducational in 1982 as a result of the Supreme Court's Mississippi University for Women v. Hogan case, but maintained its original name. 
1884: Vernon Seminary (Now Cottey College) was founded by Virginia Alice Cottey in Nevada, Missouri. The college was transferred ownership to the P.E.O. Sisterhood in 1927. 
1885: Bryn Mawr College founded. One of the Seven Sisters which was established from inception as a college for women and remains such to this day. The college's mission was to offer women rigorous intellectual training and the chance to do to original research, a European-style program that was then available only at a few elite institutions for men. The college established undergraduate and graduate programs that were widely viewed as models of academic excellence in both the humanities and the sciences, programs that elevated standards for higher education nationwide.
1893: the Woman's College of Frederick (now Hood College): The Potomac Synod purchased the building and equipment from the failing Frederick Female Seminary (in Frederick, MD) to move the women's department from Mercersburg College in Pennsylvania to a spot below the Mason-Dixon Line.
1895: College of Notre Dame of Maryland (now Notre Dame of Maryland University): First Catholic women's college in the United States to offer the four-year baccalaureate degree.

Timeline

Colonial-era schools

1742: Bethlehem Female Seminary: Founded in Germantown and later moved to Bethlehem, Pennsylvania. It received its collegiate charter in 1863 and in 1913, it became the Moravian Seminary and College for Women. In 1954, it merged with the male institution Moravian College and Theological Seminary and became the coeducational school, Moravian College
1772: Little Girls' School (now Salem College), Winston-Salem, North Carolina: Originally established as a primary school, it later became an academy (high school) and finally a college. It is the oldest female educational establishment that is still a women's college, and the oldest female institution in the Southern United States.

1780s–1820s
1787: Young Ladies' Academy of Philadelphia 
1792: Mrs. Rowson's Academy for Young Ladies, Boston, MA: Prolific writer and actress Susanna Rowson founded this progressive school for middle-class young women.
1792: Litchfield Female Academy, Litchfield, CT: Sarah Pierce founded the school and developed its curriculum; it closed in 1833.
1803: Bradford Academy (now Bradford College), Bradford, MA: Formed as a coeducational secondary school, it became a college-level women's institution in 1836; it became coeducational again in 1972.
1814: Louisburg Female Academy (now Louisburg College): Founded in North Carolina; Louisburg Female College, founded in 1857. Later merged with Franklin Male Academy
1814: Nazareth Academy (now Spalding University): Founded near Bardstown, Kentucky; given degree-granting authority in 1829. Opened its current Louisville campus in 1920; all instruction moved to Louisville in 1971. Became coeducational in 1973.
1814: Troy Female Seminary, Troy, NY: It became the Emma Willard School in 1895
1818: Elizabeth Female Academy: First female educational institution in Mississippi; it closed in 1843
1821: Clinton Female Seminary: Georgia. Forerunner to Wesleyan College GeorgiaInfo - Carl Vinson Institute of Government
1822: Gummere Academy, Burlington, NJ: Founded by Quaker Sammuel Gummere who then sold the school to George Washington Doane who then founded St. Mary's Hall.
1822: Athens Female Academy (now Athens State University), Athens, Alabama.
1823: Hartford Female Seminary, Hartford, CT: It closed towards the later half of the 19th century
1827: The Linden Wood School for Girls (now Lindenwood University), St. Charles, Missouri: became coeducational in 1969.
1828: Ipswich Female Seminary, Ipswich, MA: Founded by two female educators, Zilpah Grant and Mary Lyon, it was the first women's seminary in the nation to be endowed and to offer its graduates diplomas; it closed in 1876.

1830s

1831: LaGrange Female Academy (now LaGrange College): Founded in LaGrange, Georgia, it became LaGrange Female College in 1851, and coeducational in 1953
1833: Columbia Female Academy (now Stephens College): Originally established as an academy (high school), it later became a college. It is the second oldest female educational establishment that is still a women's college
1834: Green River Female Academy: founded in Todd County, Kentucky was an all-female preparatory school until 1861 when it became co-educational; the building is now restored and run as a museum by the Green River Academy Preservation Society
1834: Wheaton Female Seminary (now Wheaton College, Massachusetts): Founded with the help of Mary Lyon; Wheaton became a college in 1912 and coeducational in 1987
1835: Livingston Female Academy and State Normal College (now University of West Alabama); it became coeducational in the 1950s
1836: Holly Springs Female Institute, Holly Springs, MS: Destroyed by the Union Army in 1864.
1836: Washington Female Seminary: closed in 1948
1836: Wesleyan College: Chartered as the Georgia Female College on December 23, 1836, Wesleyan is the world's oldest women's college. Still a women's college
1837: St. Mary's Hall (now Doane Academy): Originally established as a female seminary by George Washington Doane, the 2nd Bishop of the Episcopal Church of New Jersey. First academic school for women in the United States founded on church principles.
1837: Mount Holyoke Female Seminary (now Mount Holyoke College): It is the oldest (and first) of the Seven Sisters
1837: Sharon Female College: closed in 1873.
1837: Female Collegiate Institute founded in Georgetown, Kentucky; moved to Millersburg in 1848 and in 1862 renamed Millersburg Female College; in 1931 incorporated into Millersburg Military Institute, now defunct 
1838: Judson Female Institute (Judson College (Alabama)): Founded in Marion, Alabama, it became Judson College in 1903 and later Judson College
1839: Farmville Female Seminary Association (now Longwood University): Founded in Farmville, Virginia; it became coeducational in 1976.

1840s

1841: Saint Mary-of-the-Woods College: The college was founded as an academy for young women in 1841 by a French nun, Saint Mother Theodore Guerin. Saint Mary-of-the-Woods College is the nation's oldest Catholic liberal arts college for women. In 1846, Saint Mary-of-the-Woods College was granted the first charter for the higher education of women in the state of Indiana. SMWC conferred its first bachelor of arts degree in 1899. The College's campus program remains an all-female institute.  However, SMWC became fully co-educational in 2015.
1841: Academy of the Sacred Heart (now Manhattanville College) founded in New York City
1842: Fulton Female Academy (now Synodical College): Founded in Fulton, Missouri, it closed in 1928
1842: Valley Union Seminary (now Hollins University): Established in Roanoke, Virginia as a coeducational school, it became a school for women in 1852, and was renamed Hollins Institute in 1855, Hollins College in 1911, and Hollins University in 1998
1842: Augusta Female Seminary (now Mary Baldwin University): Founded in Staunton, Virginia, it became the Mary Baldwin Seminary in 1895, Mary Baldwin College in 1923, and Mary Baldwin University in 2016. While the school has had a coeducational adult degree program since 1977, and later added coeducational graduate degree programs, its undergraduate college for traditional students, the Residential College, was not open to men until 2017. The Virginia Women's Institute for Leadership (VWIL) cadet corps at Mary Baldwin, as its name states, remains women-only.
1843: Memphis Conference Female Institute (later Lambuth University): Became coeducational in 1923. Closed in 2011; the former Lambuth campus now houses a branch campus of the University of Memphis.
1843: Port Gibson Female College: closed in 1908
1844: Saint Mary's College (Indiana): Founded by the Sisters of the Holy Cross. In the mid-1950s, it became the first college in the United States to grant advanced degrees in theology to women.
1845: Baylor Female Department (established alongside Baylor University as the Female Department. Obtained separate charter in 1866, moved to Belton, TX 1886. Later names were Baylor Female College, Baylor College for Women, Mary Hardin-Baylor College, and now known as University of Mary Hardin–Baylor.
1845: Limestone Springs Female High School (now Limestone University): Founded in Gaffney, South Carolina, it began accepting a few male students in the 1920s (who did not live on campus) and became fully coeducational in the late 1960s.
1846: Greensboro Female College: Charted in 1838 in Greensboro, North Carolina; it is now the coeducational school Greensboro College
1846: Illinois Conference Female Academy: It is now the coeducational school, MacMurray College
1847:  Kentucky Female Orphan School (now Midway University): The school's day program at its main campus became fully coeducational in 2016; evening, weekend, and online classes and programs had been coeducational for many years. It planned to open a coeducational pharmacy school at a separate campus in 2011, but withdrew that school's accreditation application for unknown reasons.
1847: Academy of Mount Saint Vincent (now College of Mount Saint Vincent): Founded by the Sisters of Charity of New York; moved from Manhattan to current Riverdale, Bronx site in the 1850s and began service as degree-granting, four-year liberal arts college in 1911. Became coeducational in 1974.
1848: Philadelphia School of Design for Women (now Moore College of Art and Design): It is the first and only art school which is a women's college
1848: Chowan Baptist Female Institute; it is now the coeducational school Chowan University.
1848: Drexel University College of Medicine: It is now, after several changes including becoming co-ed, Drexel University's medical school.

1849: The Oread Institute, Worcester, MA: It closed in 1881.
1849: Forsyth Female Collegiate Institute: It became Tift College, which is now a part of Mercer University.

1850s

1850 "Women's Medical College of Pennsylvania" (now part of "Drexel University") trained and graduated the first female physicians in the country and the first black female physicians.
1850: Carolina Female College: It was established in Anson County by an act of the North Carolina legislature.  Closed in 1867 for financial reasons.
1851: Christian College (later Columbia College): It was the first women's college west of the Mississippi River to be chartered by a state legislature.
1851: Cherokee Female Seminary: It is the first institute of higher learning exclusively for women the United States west of the Mississippi River. Along with the Cherokee Male Seminary, this was the first college created by a tribe instead of the US federal government.
1851: Tennessee and Alabama Female Institute (later Mary Sharp College): It was the first women's college to grant college degrees to women that were the equivalent of those given to men; the college closed due to financial hardship in 1896.
1851: Yalobusha Female Institute: Later the Emma Mercer Institute and then Grenada Female College.  Closed in 1936 for financial reasons.
1852: Young Ladies Seminary (now Mills College at Northeastern University): It was the first women's college in United States west of the Rocky Mountains. It merged with Northeastern University in 2022.
1853: Beaver College: It became the coeducational school Arcadia University
1853: Ohio Wesleyan Female College: It merged with Ohio Wesleyan University in 1877
1853: Mt. Carroll Seminary Later Frances Shimer Academy (now Shimer College): became a coeducational in 1950 and later adopted the Great Books curriculum.
1853: Hagerstown Female Seminary (later Kee Mar College) in Hagerstown, Maryland. Closed in 1911.
1854: Columbia College (Columbia, South Carolina)
1854: Andrew Female College: Became coeducational in 1956
1854: Sayre Female Institute, Lexington, Kentucky, founded in 1854 as the Transylvania Female Institute; renamed in honor of founder David Sayre in 1855 and moved from Mill Street to present location (now Sayre School); chartered in 1856 to confer collegiate degrees; continues today as a private coeducational college preparatory school.
1855: Elmira Female College (now Elmira College): It is the oldest college still in existence which (as a women's college) granted degrees to women that were the equivalent of those given to men; the college became coeducational in 1969.
1855: Mansfield Female College: Merged into Centenary College of Louisiana in 1930.
1855: Western Female Seminary: Became Western College for Women and later merged with Miami University in 1974.
1855: Davenport Female College (later Davenport College), Lenoir, NC: Chartered by the North Carolina General Assembly in 1859. Merged with Greensboro College in 1938. Davenport College history
1857: Peace Institute (now William Peace University), Raleigh, NC: became coeducational in 2012.
1857: Charlotte Female Institute, Charlotte, NC: became the coeducational Queens University of Charlotte in 1987 after World War II
1857: Corona Female College, Corinth, MS: Used as a hospital by the Union Army from 1862 and destroyed in 1864.
1858: Susquehanna Female College, Selinsgrove, PA: Closed in 1872, students transferred to the Missionary Institute of the Evangelical Lutheran Church, now Susquehanna University
1858: Whitworth Female College, Brookhaven, MS

1860s
1861: Vassar College: It is the first of the Seven Sisters which was established from inception as a college for women; it became coeducational in 1969.
1864: Visitation Academy: It later became Ottumwa Heights College and closed in 1980
1865: Meridian Female College
1866: Baylor Female College separated from Baylor, obtaining a separate charter (originally the Female Department of Baylor University, founded in 1845): Became the coeducational University of Mary Hardin–Baylor in 1971.
1867: Cedar Crest College
1867: Home School for Girls (now Southern Virginia University): Founded as a girls' secondary school, it added junior college classes in 1922, by which time it was known as Southern Seminary and Junior College. It became coeducational in 1994.
1867: Scotia Seminary (now Barber-Scotia College): It was the first historically black female institution of higher education established after the American Civil War and became a women's college in 1946. It became a coeducational school in 1954 and lost its accreditation in 2004.  (historically black college)
1867: Lynnland Female Institute, also, Lynnland Female College: started in 1867 in Glendale, Kentucky the same year the Glendale Equal Rights Association started; closed in 1915 
1868: Wells College: It became coeducational in 2005
1869: Pennsylvania Female College: It became Chatham College in 1955 and Chatham University in 2007.  Although the university is coeducational, the undergraduate college, Chatham College for Women, remains women-only. The undergraduate college at its founding granted degrees to women that were the equivalent of those given to men.
1869: Wilson College: Became coeducational in 2013.
1869: Hamilton College (Kentucky): It closed in 1932

1870s

 1870
 Hunter College: became coeducational in the 1950s
 Martin Female College: Became Martin College in 1908 and went coeducational in 1938, becoming Martin Methodist College in 1986. The school was sold to the University of Tennessee system in 2021, becoming the current University of Tennessee Southern. 
 Sullins College: closed in 1976
 1871: Ursuline College, Pepper Pike, Ohio: Still in operation, it was Ohio's first women's college, founded by the Catholic Ursuline Sisters of Cleveland.
 1872: St. Mary's Institute: Became Mount Mary College in 1929
 1873
 Bennett College: Founded in Greensboro, North Carolina as a coeducational school, it became a women's college in 1926
 College of Notre Dame of Maryland: Now Notre Dame of Maryland University, becoming coeducational later in 2023
 Blue Mountain Female Institute: Now Blue Mountain College
 Cherokee Baptist Female College: Became the coeducational school Shorter College during the 1950s
 1875
 Wellesley College: Originally charted in 1870 (Seven Sisters)
 Smith College: Originally chartered in 1871 (Seven Sisters)
 Mount Hermon Female Seminary: Founded in Clinton, Mississippi, it closed in 1924 (historically black college)
 Mount Vernon Seminary and College: Merged with George Washington University in 1999
1878: Georgia Baptist Female Seminary (now the Brenau University Women's College): Despite its name, the college was never formally associated with any church or religious group. Founded in Gainesville, Georgia, it became Brenau College in 1900 and Brenau University in 1992. The university still boasts its robust Women's College on its historic Gainesville campus today, educating women to be, as its motto states, "as gold refined by fire."
1879: Harvard Annex: It was chartered as Radcliffe College by the Commonwealth of Massachusetts in 1894; Radcliffe closed in 1999 when its merger with Harvard University was complete (Seven Sisters)

1880s

 1881
 Atlanta Baptist Female Seminary (now Spelman College): It was the first historically black female institution of higher education to receive its collegiate charter in 1924, making it the oldest historically black women's college
 Incarnate Word School: Originally chartered as a women's college, it absorbed an all-female secondary school in 1909, at which time it became the College and Academy of the Incarnate Word. After spinning off the secondary school later in the 20th century, it became coeducational in 1970, and is now known as the University of the Incarnate Word.
 Tillotson College: Founded as a coeducational, it was a women's college from 1926 to 1935. It is now the coeducational school, Huston–Tillotson University (historically black college)
 1883
 Seton Hill University: Some academic programs, mainly in the performing arts, became coeducational in the 1980s; became fully coeducational in 2002.
 Hartshorn Memorial College founded in Richmond, Virginia. In 1932, it merged with Virginia Union University.
 1884
 Industrial Institute & College, (now Mississippi University for Women): It was the first public women's college; became coeducational in 1982 as a result of the Supreme Court's Mississippi University for Women v. Hogan case, but maintained its original name
 Cottey College is founded as "Vernon Seminary," a day and boarding school for girls.
 1885
 Bryn Mawr College (Seven Sisters)
 The Woman's College of Baltimore: Became Goucher College in 1910 and coeducational in 1986.  It was the sister school to Johns Hopkins University. 
 1886
 H. Sophie Newcomb Memorial College: at Tulane University. It was the first coordinate women's college within a U.S. university. Closed in 2006, a suit by descendants of the founder lasted until 2011 when the plaintiffs gave up the case.
 Mary Allen Seminary: Founded in Crockett, Houston County, Texas. It became coeducational in 1933.
 1887
 Evelyn College for Women: It was the coordinate women's college of Princeton University in Princeton, New Jersey; it closed in 1897
 Alverno College
 1888
 Women's College of Western Reserve University (renamed Flora Stone Mather College in 1931) ultimately merged with several other colleges to form the Case Western Reserve University Federation in 1967.
 Colorado Women's College known as the "Vassar of the West" was founded in Denver; it merged with the University of Denver in 1982.
 1889
 Decatur Female Seminary (now Agnes Scott College): Founded in Decatur, Georgia, it became the Agnes Scott Institute in 1890, and Agnes Scott College in 1906
 Barnard College (Seven Sisters)
 Georgia Normal and Industrial College (now Georgia College & State University): The coordinate college for Georgia Tech, it awarded its first degrees in 1917 and became coeducational in 1967.
 Converse University: Founded in 1889 in Spartanburg, South Carolina as Converse College. It gradually transitioned away from single-sex education, adding coeducational graduate and online programs, but its residential undergraduate program remained women-only until it became coeducational on July 1, 2021, with the school adopting the "University" designation at that time.

1890s
1890: Mount Saint Agnes College: It closed in 1972
1891: Pembroke College: Was the coordinate women's college for Brown University in Providence, Rhode Island; it merged with Brown in 1971
1891: Randolph-Macon Woman's College: It become coeducational and changed its name to Randolph College in 2007
1891: North Carolina Women's College: It became the coeducational University of North Carolina at Greensboro in 1963
1891:Baptist Female University, (now Meredith College): Founded in Raleigh, North Carolina, it became the Baptist University for Women, in 1891, and Meredith College in 1909
1893: The Woman's College of Frederick: in Frederick, MD. [now Hood College: Became coeducational in 2002
1896: Barber Memorial College: Founded in Anniston, Alabama, it merged with Scotia Women's College (formerly Scotia Seminary) in Concord, North Carolina in 1930 to become Barber-Scotia Junior College (historically black college)
1897: Trinity College: Trinity Washington University since 2004
1897: Bay Path University
1899: Simmons College (Massachusetts)
1899: College of Saint Elizabeth became coed in 2020 and achieved University status in 2021.

1900s

1901: Sweet Briar College
1901: Girls Industrial College founded. Known as Texas Woman's University since 1957. Technically co-ed since 1994, but still has a primarily female student body.
1901: St. Clara's College: Renamed Rosary College in 1922; Became coeducational in 1970 and Dominican University (Illinois) in 1997
1903: Margaret Morrison Carnegie College: It was the coordinate women's college of Carnegie Mellon University between 1903 and 1973
1903: Young Woman's Industrial Club: It became Skidmore College in 1922 and coeducational in 1971
1904: The College of New Rochelle
1905: Florida State College for Women: Founded as the coeducational West Florida Seminary in 1851. After multiple name changes, it was converted into a women's college in 1905, with "for Women" attached to its then-current name of Florida State College. The school returned to coeducation in 1947 and changed its name yet again to the current Florida State University.
1905: St. Catherine University (known as the College of St. Catherine before 2009)
1907: College of Saint Teresa: It closed in 1989.
1908: Marymount College, Tarrytown: It became part of Fordham University in 2000 and closed in 2007.
1908: All Saints' College: founded in Vicksburg, Mississippi.  Associated with the Episcopal Church and admitted only white women.
1908: Georgian Court University: Admitted its first male day students in 2012, with men allowed to live on campus and participate in all activities since fall 2013.
1908: William Smith College is founded: Eventually becomes a coordinate college known as Hobart and William Smith
1908: The State Normal and Industrial School for Women at Harrisonburg: Founded as a junior college, it began awarding bachelor's degrees in 1916, and changed its name three times in its first 30 years. In 1946, when it was known as Madison College, it admitted its first male day students, becoming de facto coeducational, although it would not officially be recognized as a coeducational institution until 1966. In 1976, it adopted its current name of James Madison University.
1908: State Normal and Industrial School for Women at Fredericksburg: Developed as a normal and manual arts school and renamed Mary Washington College; it became the coordinate women's college of the University of Virginia in 1944. In 1970, UVA, which had previously admitted women only in its education, nursing, and postgraduate schools, became fully coeducational, as did Mary Washington. The two schools were separated due to changes of mission and geographic distance in 1972. The school's current name, University of Mary Washington, was adopted in 2004.
1908: Oklahoma College for Women: Founded as Oklahoma Industrial Institute and College for Girls, but name was changed to Oklahoma College for Women in 1912. Became coeducational in 1965 and simultaneously renamed Oklahoma College of Liberal Arts. Currently named University of Science and Arts of Oklahoma.
1909: Lesley College: It became coeducational in 2005

1910s
1911: Pine Manor College: became coeducational in 2014. Boston College took over it in 2020, becoming the Pine Manor Institute for Student Success.
1911: Connecticut College: became coeducational in 1969
1912: Saint Joseph's College of Maine: became coeducational in 1970
1913: College of Saint Benedict: Has been partnered with the all-male Saint John's University, located about 5 miles (8 km) away, since 1955, and the two schools have operated a common academic program with fully coeducational classes since 1961. CSB and SJU remain legally and administratively separate, with separate residential facilities and athletic programs.
1914: Westhampton College: Founded as the coordinate college for Richmond College (1830) and a component of its growth into the University of Richmond (1920). Today, the academic operations of the two colleges are merged, but Westhampton College remains as the co-curricular program for undergraduate women and curricular women's studies.
1914: Johnson & Wales School of Business: Started as a business school for women with one typewriter and one student. The mission "to teach a thing not for its own sake but for what lies beyond" is still in line with JWU's current mission. The school, through many name changes is now Johnson & Wales University.
1916: Russell Sage College: became coeducational in 2020 after the merger with Sage College of Albany. Formerly a part of The Sage Colleges, which consolidated as one institution and rebranded Russell Sage.
1916: St. Joseph's College for Women: became coeducational in 1970 and renamed St. Joseph's College, New York
1918: New Jersey College for Women: Founded as the coordinate college for Rutgers University and became Douglass College in 1955. In 2007, it was merged with the other undergraduate liberal arts colleges at the main Rutgers campus, at that time becoming a non-degree granting unit of Rutgers and being renamed Douglass Residential College.
1919: Emmanuel College, Boston: became coeducational in 2001

1920s

1920
 College of Mount St. Joseph: Technically founded in 1920, when it received formal state approval to operate as a college, but predecessor institutions had offered two years of college education for females for several decades. Became coeducational in 1986, and adopted its current name of Mount St. Joseph University in 2014.  
 Villa Maria College: Became Immaculata College in 1929 and Immaculata University in 2002. It became coeducational in 2005.
1921
 Rosemont College
 Villa Madonna College: Although founded as a women's college, it was affiliated with the all-male St. Thomas More College. In 1945, Villa Madonna became coeducational, absorbing St. Thomas More College. The school moved to a new campus in 1968, becoming Thomas More College at that time, and became Thomas More University in 2018.
1922: Notre Dame College (Ohio): Became coeducational in the spring term of 2001.
1923
 College of Saint Mary
 Marymount Junior College: Became Marymount College of Los Angeles in 1948 when it began offering bachelor's degrees. Merged with Loyola University of Los Angeles, originally all-male at the undergraduate level but later partially coed, in 1973 to create Loyola Marymount University.
 Mount St. Scholastica College: Merged with the all-male St. Benedict's College in 1971 to form the co-educational Benedictine College
1924: Chestnut Hill College: Began a coeducational graduate program in 1980, and became fully coeducational in 2003.
1925
 Albertus Magnus College: It became coeducational in 1985
 Mount Saint Joseph College for Women: Originally located in the rural Daviess County, Kentucky community of Maple Mount, the school soon opened a coeducational extension branch in nearby Owensboro. The extension branch eventually grew into its own campus, and the school became coeducational when the two campuses were merged at the Owensboro location in 1950. Became Brescia College in 1951 and Brescia University in 1998.  
 Mount St. Mary's College
1926
 Mercyhurst College: It became coeducational in 1969, and adopted its current name of Mercyhurst University in 2012.
 Sarah Lawrence College: It became coeducational in 1968
 Scripps College
1927: Regis College: It become coeducational in 2007
1928: Elms College: It became coeducational in 1998.

1930s–1980s
1930: Mundelein College: Became coeducational in 1968, but remained primarily women-serving; absorbed into Loyola University Chicago in 1991.
1932: Bennington College: It became coeducational in 1969
1932: Saint Joseph College (Connecticut): Now known as the University of Saint Joseph, it gradually transitioned away from single-sex education in the 21st century. While its undergraduate day program remained all-female, it began admitting male graduate and evening students. The transition was completed in 2018 when the first male students were admitted to its day program.
1936: Marymount Manhattan College: It is currently coeducational
1938: Ursuline College (Kentucky): Merged into the previously all-male Bellarmine College in 1968; the merged school is now Bellarmine University.
1941: Annhurst College: It closed in 1980
1941: Mercy College of Detroit: Opened as a women's college, later became coeducational, and merged with the University of Detroit in 1990, creating the University of Detroit Mercy.
1946: Mount Sacred Heart College: It closed in 1997
1947: Garland Junior College: It was absorbed into Simmons College in 1976.
1954: Stern College for Women
1963: Pitzer College: It became coeducational in 1970
1968: Kirkland College: It merged with Hamilton College in 1979
1982: Women's College of the University of Denver reclaimed its historical name Colorado Women's College in 2013 and closed in 2020

See also
 Seven Sisters (colleges)
List of current and historical women's universities and colleges in the United States
Women's colleges in the United States
Women's colleges in the Southern United States
Women's College Coalition
List of girls' schools in the United States

Further reading
Creighton, Joanne V. A Tradition of Their Own: Or, If a Woman Can Now Be President of Harvard, Why Do We Still Need Women's Colleges?.
Guy-Sheftall, Beverly. "Black Women and Higher Education: Spelman and Bennett Colleges Revisited." The Journal of Negro Education, Vol. 51, No. 3, The Impact of Black Women in Education: An Historical Overview (Summer, 1982), pp. 278–287.

 Harwarth, Irene B. "A Closer Look at Women's Colleges." National Institute on Postsecondary Education, Libraries, and Lifelong Learning, Office of Educational Research and Improvement, U.S. Department of Education, 1999.
---, Mindi Maline and Elizabeth DeBra. "Women's Colleges in the United States: History, Issues, and Challenges: Executive Summary." U.S. Department of Education National Institute on Postsecondary Education, Libraries, and Lifelong Learning.
Indiana University Center for Postsecondary Research (IUCPR). "New study finds women's colleges are better equipped to help their students."
 Horowitz, Helen Lefkowitz.  Alma Mater: Design and Experience in the Women's Colleges from Their Nineteenth-Century Beginnings to the 1930s, Amherst: University of Massachusetts Press, 1993 (2nd edition).
Muhlenfeld, Elisabeth and Nancy Gray. "Women's colleges must be an option."  The Roanoke Times, September 14, 2006.
 Rosenberg, Rosalind. "The Limits of Access: The History Of Coeducation in America." In Women and Higher Education: Essays from the Mount Holyoke College Sesquicentennial Symposia. Ed. John Mack Faragher and Florence Howe. New York: Norton, 1988.

Notes

 
Women's colleges
History of education in the United States
colleges usa